The yellow-throated squirrel (Sciurus gilvigularis) is a tree squirrel in the genus Sciurus endemic to South America. It is found in Brazil, Guyana and Venezuela.

References

Naturerve.org

Sciurus
Mammals of Brazil
Mammals of Guyana
Mammals of Venezuela
Mammals described in 1842